Alexandr Rabotnitskii (born 21 September 1993 in Omsk) is a Russian Paralympic athlete. He won silver in the Men's 1500 metres T20 at the 2020 Summer Paralympics in Tokyo.

References

External links
 

1993 births
Living people
Russian male middle-distance runners
Paralympic athletes of Russia
Paralympic silver medalists for the Russian Paralympic Committee athletes
Paralympic medalists in athletics (track and field)
Athletes (track and field) at the 2020 Summer Paralympics
Medalists at the 2020 Summer Paralympics
Sportspeople from Omsk
20th-century Russian people
21st-century Russian people